Marguerite Porete (13th century1 June 1310) was a French-speaking mystic and the author of The Mirror of Simple Souls, a work of Christian mysticism dealing with the workings of agape (divine love). She was burnt at the stake for heresy in Paris in 1310 after a lengthy trial, refusing to remove her book from circulation or recant her views.

Today, Porete's work has been of interest to a diverse number of scholars. Those interested in medieval mysticism, and more specifically beguine mystical writing, cite The Mirror of Simple Souls in their studies. The book is also seen as a primary text regarding the medieval Heresy of the Free Spirit. Study of Eckhart has shown a similarity between his and Porete's ideas about union with God. Porete has also been of interest to those studying medieval women's writing.

Life

Porete's life is recorded only in the accounts of her Inquisition trial for heresy, at which she was condemned to be burnt at the stake. This information about Porete is probably biased and certainly incomplete. She was said to have come from the County of Hainaut, a French-speaking principality in the Holy Roman Empire, but this is uncertain. Her high level of education means she is likely to have had upper-class origins. She was associated with the beguine movement and was therefore able to travel fairly freely.

Trial and death
Porete appears to have written the first version of her book in the 1290s. Sometime between 1296 and 1306 it was deemed heretical, and the Bishop of Cambrai condemned it to be publicly burned in her presence at Valenciennes. One of the taboos Porete had broken was writing the book in Old French rather than in Latin and she was ordered not to circulate her ideas or the book again. In spite of this, she continued to do so.

It has recently been suggested that she was arrested in Châlons-en-Champagne in 1308, after she gave her book to the local bishop. She was then handed to the Inquisitor of France, the Dominican William of Paris, also known as William of Humbert, on grounds of heresy, in spite of her assertion in the book that she had consulted three church authorities about her writings, including the highly respected Master of Theology Godfrey of Fontaines, and had gained their approval.

Porete had been arrested with a Beghard, Guiard de Cressonessart, who was also put on trial for heresy. Guiard declared himself to be Porete's defender. After being held in prison in Paris for a year and a half, their trial began.

Marguerite refused to speak to William of Paris or any of her inquisitors during her imprisonment and trial. In 1310 a commission of twenty-one theologians investigated a series of fifteen propositions drawn from the book (only three of which are securely identifiable today), and judged them to be heretical. Among those who condemned the book were the ecclesiastical textual scholar, Nicholas of Lyra.

Guiard, under tremendous pressure, eventually confessed and was found guilty. Porete, on the other hand, refused to recant her ideas, withdraw her book or cooperate with the authorities, and refused to take the oath required by the Inquisitor to proceed with the trial. Guiard was imprisoned because he had confessed, but Porete's refusal to confess led the tribunal to pronounce her guilty and sentence her to be burnt at the stake as a relapsed heretic. Three bishops passed final judgement upon her. Porete died on 1 June 1310 in Paris at the Place de Grève.

The Inquisitor spoke of her as a pseudo-mulier, "fake woman", and described the Mirror as 'filled with errors and heresies.' A record of the trial was appended to the chronicle begun by Guillaume de Nangis. Despite the negative view taken towards Marguerite by Nangis, the chronicle reports that the crowd was moved to tears by the calmness with which she faced her death.

After her death extracts from the book were cited in the decree Ad Nostrum, issued by the Council of Vienne in 1311 to condemn the Free Spirit movement as heretical.

The Mirror of Simple Souls

The title of Porete's book refers to the simple soul which is united with God and has no will other than God's own. Some of the language, as well as the format of a dialogue between characters such as Love, Virtue and the Soul, reflects a familiarity with the style of courtly love which was popular at the time, and attests to Porete's high level of education and sophistication.

Much of the book resembles a rational Boethian style argument between several parties, but also is written similarly to the medieval French poem the Romance of the Rose. Marguerite says that the Soul must give up Reason, whose logical, conventional grasp of reality cannot fully comprehend God and the presence of Divine Love. The "Annihilated Soul" is one that has given up everything except God through Love. According to Porete, when the Soul is truly filled with God's love, it is united with God and thus in a state of union which causes it to transcend the contradictions of this world. In such a beatific state it cannot sin because it is wholly united with God's Will and thus incapable of acting in such a way - a phenomenon which the standard theology describes as the effect of Divine grace, which suppresses a person's sinful nature. In fact, one of the main targets of her book is to teach to readers or listeners how to get this simple state through devices, for instance: images. It is in this vision of Man being united with God through Love, thus returning to its source, and the presence of God in everything that she connects in thought with the ideas of Eckhart. Porete and Eckhart had acquaintances in common and there is much speculation as to whether they ever met or had access to each other's work.

Porete references the words of John the Evangelist in her own writing:
Porete's vision of the Soul in ecstatic union with God, moving in a state of perpetual joy and peace, is a repetition of the Catholic doctrine of the Beatific Vision, albeit experienced in this life and not in the next. Where Porete ran into trouble with some authorities was in her description of the Soul in this state being above the worldly dialectic of conventional morality and the teachings and control of the earthly church. Porete argues that the Soul in such a sublime state is above the demands of ordinary virtue, not because virtue is not needed but because in its state of union with God virtue becomes automatic. As God can do no evil and cannot sin, the exalted/Annihilated soul, in perfect union with Him, no longer is capable of evil or sin. Church authorities viewed the concept that someone was above the demands of ordinary virtue as amoral.

Legacy
After Porete's death, however, the Mirror was circulated as an anonymous work. Originally written in Old French, it was translated into Latin, Italian, and Middle English and circulated widely. In spite of its reputation as a heretical work it remained popular in Medieval times. At one point it was thought that John of Ruusbroec had written it.

Only in 1946 was the authorship of the Mirror recognised again, when Romana Guarnieri identified Latin manuscripts of the Mirror in the Vatican as the supposedly lost book of Marguerite. The Middle French manuscript of the text, probably made after 1370, was published for the first time in 1965.

Assessment

There has been some speculation as to why Porete was considered controversial. Growing hostility to the Beguine movement among Franciscans and Dominicans, the political machinations of Philip IV of France, who was also busy suppressing the Knights Templar, and ecclesiastical fear at the spread of the anti-hierarchical Free Spirit movement have all been suggested.

Some also associated her with the Brethren of the Free Spirit, a group which was considered heretical because of their antinomian views. The connection between Porete and the Free Spirits is somewhat tenuous, though, as further scholarship has determined that they were less closely related than some Church authorities believed.

Porete's status as a Medieval mystic has grown in recent decades, placing her alongside Mechthild of Magdeburg and Hadewijch in expressing the Love Mysticism of Beguine spirituality.

In 2006 poet Anne Carson wrote a poetic libretto entitled Decreation, the second part of which takes as its subject Marguerite Porete and her work, The Mirror of Simple Souls as part of exploration of how women (Sappho, Simone Weil and Porete) "tell God."

See also
Hildegard of Bingen
Julian of Norwich
Margery Kempe
Sister Catherine Treatise

References

Footnotes

Notes

Further reading
 Field, Sean L. "The Master and Marguerite: Godfrey of Fontaines' praise of The Mirror of Simple Souls," Journal of Medieval History, 35,2 (2009), 136–149.
 Field, Sean L. The Beguine, the Angel, and the Inquisitor: The Trials of Marguerite Porete and Guiard of Cressonessart (Notre Dame, IN: University of Notre Dame Press, 2012).  
 Sean L. Field, Robert E. Lerner, Sylvain Piron (dir.), Marguerite Porete et le “Miroir des simples âmes”: Perspectives historiques, philosophiques et littéraires, Paris, Vrin, 2013. 
 Michael Frassetto, "Marguerite Porete: Mysticism, Beguines and Heretics of the Free Spirit," in idem, Heretic Lives: Medieval Heresy from Bogomil and the Cathars to Wyclif and Hus (London, Profile Books, 2007), 135–150.
P. García Acosta, Poética de la visibilidad en el Mirouer des simples ames de Marguerite Porete (Un estudio sobre el uso de la imagen en la enseñanza religiosa medieval), Universidad Pompeu Fabra, 2009 .
 S. [Zan] Kocher, Allegories of Love in Marguerite Porete’s 'Mirror of Simple Souls'. Turnhout, Belgium: Brepols, 2009. .
 R. Lahav, "Marguerite Porete and the Predicament of her Preaching in Fourteenth Century France," in Laurence Lux-Sterritt and Carmen Mangion (eds), Gender, Catholicism and Spirituality: Women and the Roman Catholic Church in Britain and Europe, 1200-1900 (Basingstoke, Palgrave Macmillan, 2011),
Bernard McGinn, The Flowering of Mysticism, (1998), pp. 244–265.
 Miller, Tanya Stabler. “What’s in a Name? Clerical Representations of Parisian Beguines, 1200-1327,” The Journal of Medieval History, 33:1 (2007): 60–86.
 Miller, Tanya Stabler. The Beguines of Medieval Paris: Gender, Patronage, and Spiritual Authority (University of Pennsylvania Press, 2014)  
Marguerite Porete, The Mirror of Simple Souls, ed. Ellen Babinsky. Paulist Press, 1993. .
J. M. Robinson, Nobility and Annihilation in Marguerite Porete's 'Mirror of Simple Souls'. SUNY Press, 2001. . .
 Swan, Laura, The Wisdom of the Beguines: the Forgotten Story of a Medieval Women's Movement, BlueBridge, 2014
Paul Verdeyen, Marguerete Porete: Le Mirouer des Simples Ames, CCCM 69, (Turnholt: Brepols, 1986) [contains the text of the one surviving Middle French manuscript, and an edition of the Latin text]
International Bibliography on Marguerite Porete

Year of birth missing
1310 deaths
13th-century French women
13th-century French women writers
13th-century French writers
13th-century Christian mystics
14th-century French women
14th-century French women writers
14th-century French writers
14th-century Christian mystics
Roman Catholic mystics
People executed for heresy
People excommunicated by the Catholic Church
Executed French people
Executed French women
Beguines and Beghards
People executed by France by burning
14th-century executions by France
Women mystics